Hellebuyck is a French surname. Notable people with the surname include:

Connor Hellebuyck (born 1993), American ice hockey player
David Hellebuyck (born 1979), French footballer 
Eddy Hellebuyck (born 1961), American marathon runner
Georges Hellebuyck (1890–1975), Belgian sailor

References